The term bee bird may refer to:
Bee-eater, an Old World group of birds in the family Meropidae
Bee hummingbird, a bird native to Cuba that is the world's smallest
Bumblebee hummingbird, a bird endemic in Mexico